Lost for Words may refer to:

Music
 Lost for Words (Acceptance album)
 "Lost for Words" (Pink Floyd song)
 "Lost for Words" (Ronan Keating song)
 "Lost for Words", a song by Saga from their 2012 album 20/20

Film and literature
 Lost for Words (1999 film), a British TV film
 Lost for Words, a 1991 autobiography by Deric Longden, basis for the 1999 film
 Lost for Words, a 2004 book on language by John Humphrys
 Lost for Words (2013 film)
 Lost for Words, a 2014 novel by Edward St Aubyn

See also
 A Loss for Words, American pop punk band from Massachusetts